Tziarra Lanae King (born August 24, 1998) is an American professional soccer player who plays as a forward for National Women's Soccer League (NWSL) club OL Reign.

Early life 
Raised in Sicklerville, New Jersey, King played for the varsity soccer team at Winslow Township High School where she set a record as the all-time leading scorer (for both girls and boys) with 105 career goals and 36 assists. 
She was named to the First-Team All-South Jersey team in 2014 and 2015. During high school, King also competed in track-and-field and was named New Jersey state champion in both the indoor and outdoor 4×400 during her junior year. During her senior year, her 51 goals and 14 assists ranked first in the state of New Jersey.

King played club soccer for Winslow Tigers where she helped lead the team to regional and state championships. She also played for Princeton SA IGFA 97/98 Tigers NPL and won the 2015 US Club Mid-Atlantic Regional and NEWSS Championships.

King was a regional and national futsal champion, and competed internationally for the United States Youth Futsal National Team. Also a top scholar, she was on the Honor Roll all four years and a member of the National Honor Society.

College career 
King attended North Carolina State University where she played for the NC State Wolfpack women's soccer team from 2016–2019. She was one of two players nominated by the Atlantic Coast Conference for the 2020 NCAA Woman of the Year Award, after being the conference's first women's soccer player to win the Scholar-Athlete of the Year award.

As a freshman in the 2016 season, King was a starting forward in all matches and was the Wolfpack's leading scorer with eight goals, including four game-winners. She competed on the pitch a total of 1,702 minutes. Her penalty kick goal against Minnesota helped North Carolina advance to the second round of the 2016 NCAA Championship. Top Drawer Soccer ranked King as the #28 freshman player in the country. During the 2017 season, King led the Wolfpack in goals scored (17), game-winning goals (5), and points (40). She also ranked second in the Atlantic Coast Conference (ACC) in goals and points, fourth in goals in the NCAA, and fifth in points in the NCAA. King was a starter in all 22 matches of her sophomore season and competed a total of 1,716 minutes. She scored a hat trick in North Carolina's 4-1 win over Notre Dame in the ACC Championship quarterfinals. She scored braces against  Arkansas, East Carolina University, Louisville, and Syracuse. She was twice named ACC Offensive Player of the Week. As a junior in the 2018 ACC season, King was the Wolfpack's leading scorer for the third consecutive year with 10 goals and 26 points. She was named to the MAC Hermann Trophy Watch List and finished the season ranked 47th on Top Drawer Soccer's Top 100 Player Rankings. During the 2019 season, King scored 13 goals and recorded 32 points ranking third in the ACC and 35th in the NCAA for both goals and points. She was named to the All-ACC First Team, United Soccer Coaches First Team All-Region, and United Soccer Coaches Third Team All-America. She earned TopDrawerSoccer Best XI Second Team, CoSIDA Academic All-America First Team and United Soccer Coaches Scholar All-America Second Team honors. She was twice named ACC Offensive Player of the Week and earned 2019 ACC All-Tournament Team honors.

King finished her collegiate career ranked third all-time on the Wolfpack in career goals (48) and points (115) as well as with career starts (88). She was the second player in program history to earn four-time All-ACC and multiple scholar All-America honors.

Club career

Utah Royals FC, 2020–21
King was drafted 8th overall in the 2020 NWSL College Draft by the Utah Royals FC, the first ever NC State Wolfpack player to be drafted into the NWSL. She made her professional debut in the 2020 NWSL Challenge Cup in June 2020, scoring her first professional goal less than 20 minutes after entering the field as a second-half substitute in a 3–3 draw against the Houston Dash. King was a starter in all four matches of the tournament under head coach Laura Harvey.

OL Reign, 2021–
Ahead of the 2021 season, King was traded to OL Reign in January 2021. She was a starter in 7 of the 15 matches she played. She scored the club's second goal in its 2–0 win against Orlando Pride on July 24 and provided the assist to Jess Fishlock's goal in the tenth minute. King was subsequently named NWSL Player of the Week. The Reign finished in second place during the regular season with a  record. After advancing to the NWSL Playoffs, they were eliminated by eventual champions Washington Spirit.

In 2022, King helped OL Reign finish in first place during the regular season winning the NWSL Shield.

Honors
 with OL Reign
 The Women's Cup: 2022
 NWSL Shield: 2022

Individual
 The Women's Cup Most Valuable Player: 2022
 NWSL Player of the Week: Week 10 2021
 ACC Women’s Soccer Scholar-Athlete of the Year: 2019

Other work
In September 2020, King entered into a collaboration with the National Women's Hockey League to help improve representation on NWHL merchandise.

Personal life
King goes by the nickname “Zee”. , she is engaged to Jess Fishlock.

References

External links

 
 

1998 births
Living people
American women's soccer players
Soccer players from New Jersey
People from Winslow Township, New Jersey
Sportspeople from Camden County, New Jersey
Women's association football forwards
NC State Wolfpack women's soccer players
Utah Royals FC draft picks
Utah Royals FC players
National Women's Soccer League players
Winslow Township High School alumni
OL Reign players
African-American women's soccer players
LGBT association football players
Association footballers' wives and girlfriends